Surviving is the act of survival. The surviving are those that survive..

Surviving or variant, may also refer to:

 Surviving: A Family in Crisis (film), a 1985 telefilm
 Surviving (album), a 2019 album by Jimmy Eat World

See also

 Survivability
 Survive (disambiguation)
 Survival (disambiguation)
 Survivor (disambiguation)
 Sole Survivor (disambiguation)
 Lone Survivor (disambiguation)
 Survival Skill (disambiguation)